Trimerotropis fontana is a grasshopper in the subfamily Oedipodinae ("band-winged grasshoppers"), in the family Acrididae ("short-horned grasshoppers"). A common name for Trimerotropis fontana is "fontana grasshopper".
Trimerotropis fontana is found in North America.

References

Further reading
 American Insects: A Handbook of the Insects of America North of Mexico, Ross H. Arnett. 2000. CRC Press.
 Field Guide To Grasshoppers, Katydids, And Crickets Of The United States, Capinera, Scott, Walker. 2004. Cornell University Press.
 Otte, Daniel (1995). Grasshoppers [Acridomorpha] D. Orthoptera Species File 5, 630.

External links

Oedipodinae